HMS LST-305 was a  in the Royal Navy during World War II.

Construction and career 
LST-305 was laid down on 24 July 1942, at Boston Navy Yard, Boston, Massachusetts. Launched on 10 October 1942, and commissioned into the Royal Navy on 7 December 1942.

During World War II, LST-305 was assigned to the Europe-Africa-Middle theater. She took part in the Sicilian occupation in Italy, from 9 to 15 July 1943 and 28 July to 17 August 1943. Then the Salerno landings from 9 to 21 September, of the same year. 

On 20 February 1944, she was struck by a torpedo fired by the German submarine U-230 while taking part in Operation Shingle, near Anzio, in which she later sank the next day. 

She was struck from the Navy Register on 16 May 1944.

Citations

Sources 
 
 
 
 

 

World War II amphibious warfare vessels of the United Kingdom
Ships built in Boston
1942 ships
LST-1-class tank landing ships of the Royal Navy
Ships sunk by German submarines in World War II